Cambeses may refer to the following places in Portugal:

Cambeses (Barcelos), a parish in the municipality of Barcelos
Cambeses (Monção), a parish in the municipality of Monção 
Cambeses do Rio, a parish in the municipality of Montalegre